Sasha Costanza-Chock is a communications scholar, participatory designer, and activist. They were an Associate Professor of Civic Media at Massachusetts Institute of Technology and are a Faculty Affiliate at the Berkman Klein Center for Internet & Society. Costanza-Chock is author of numerous publications about information and communication technologies and social movements, including the books Out of the Shadows, Into the Streets! Transmedia Organizing and the Immigrant Rights Movement, and Design Justice: Community-Led Practices to Build the Worlds We Need. Costanza-Chock is regularly cited in print and web media as an academic expert on issues involving media, design, and social movements.

Contributions 

Costanza-Chock researches social movements, media, and communications technologies, and has published work about Occupy Wall Street, the immigrant rights movement in the U.S., the Federal Communications Commission, the CRIS campaign for communication rights, and media policy, among other areas. As an activist they have contributed to citizen media projects such as VozMob, Transmission, and Indymedia.

Their first book Out of the Shadows, into the Streets! Transmedia Organizing and the Immigrant Rights Movement was published by The MIT Press in 2014. Writing about DREAM Act scholarship for The Journal of Higher Education, Michael Olivas called the book "a fascinating and liberating study of the social media used by various DREAMer factions". In a review in Information, Communication & Society Koen Leurs called the book "a reflective, situated, historically and contextually aware account of rights movements in the United States". It was also made available for free download by the MIT Press under a Creative Commons license.

In 2018, their paper, Design Justice, A.I., and Escape from the Matrix of Domination won a $10,000 essay competition in the Journal of Design and Science. Their second book, Design Justice: Community-Led Practices to Build the Worlds We Need was published in March 2020 by MIT Press and is available Open Access at https://design-justice.pubpub.org.

Costanza-Chock is regularly cited as an academic expert on media and activism topics, including the student response to the Stoneman Douglas High School shooting, movements to unionize tech workers, and the doxing of white supremacists.

Education and career 

Costanza-Chock received their A.B. from Harvard University, M.A. from the University of Pennsylvania, and Ph.D. from the Annenberg School for Communication and Journalism at the University of Southern California. After receiving their Ph.D., Costanza-Chock took up a position at the Massachusetts Institute of Technology, where they were Associate Professor of Civic Media. They are also a board member of Allied Media Projects.

Honors and awards
 2021 Engineering & Technology PROSE Award Finalist for their book Design Justice
 2019 MIT John S.W. Kellett '47 Award, "for an exceptional and/or sustained commitment to creating a more welcoming environment at MIT" for LGBTQ+ individuals

Bibliography

Notes

References

External links

Interview on "The Move" podcast
Open Access version of the book Design Justice: Community-led practices to build the worlds we need

American mass media scholars
Harvard University alumni
Living people
MIT School of Humanities, Arts, and Social Sciences faculty
Place of birth missing (living people)
Year of birth missing (living people)
University of Pennsylvania alumni
USC Annenberg School for Communication and Journalism alumni